We Joined the Navy is a 1962 British comedy film directed by Wendy Toye and starring Kenneth More, Lloyd Nolan, Joan O'Brien, Derek Fowlds, Graham Crowden, Esma Cannon and John Le Mesurier. Produced by Daniel M. Angel, it was based on the 1959 novel of the same name by John Winton, a former Royal Navy lieutenant commander.

The film's sets were designed by art director John Howell. It was shot in CinemaScope by cinematographer Otto Heller.

In addition to the credited cast, the film features uncredited cameos by Michael Bentine, Sidney James, Rodney Bewes and Dirk Bogarde (in a gag reference to his Doctor series role, Simon Sparrow).

Director Wendy Toye said "it was a fun film to do it really was, because it is always lovely to work with Kenny More, it always was. And Lloyd Nolan was such an excellent actor."

Plot
Lieutenant Commander Robert Badger is an excellent naval officer with one major problem: he speaks the truth at the most inopportune times. As a result, he is transferred to shore duty and then to instruct at the Royal Naval College. When his remarks are repeated by one of his students to the student's father, an anti-military member of Parliament, Badger has one last chance: he and three problem midshipmen are sent as exchange officers to the flagship of the United States Sixth Fleet. Their antics set back Anglo-American relations until they go ashore to a nation in the midst of a revolution.

Cast

 Kenneth More as Lieutenant Commander Robert Badger
 Lloyd Nolan as Vice Admiral Ryan
 Joan O'Brien as Lieutenant Carol Blair
 Mischa Auer as Colonel & President
 Jeremy Lloyd as Dewberry Jr.
 Dinsdale Landen as Bowles
 Derek Fowlds as Carson
 Denise Warren as Collette
 John Le Mesurier as George Dewberry Sr.
 Lally Bowers as Cynthia Dewberry, his wife
 Laurence Naismith as Admiral Blake
 Andrew Cruickshank as Admiral Filmer
 Walter Fitzgerald as Admiral Thomas
 John Phillips as Rear Admiral
 Ronald Leigh-Hunt as Commander Royal Navy
 Arthur Lovegrove as Chief Petty Officer Froud
 Brian Wilde as Petty Officer Gibbons
 David Warner as Sailor Painting Ship
 John Barrard as Consul
 Esma Cannon as Consul's Wife
 Sean Kelly  as Sinjett
  Marie France as Francoise 
 Alexis Kanner as Gerrit 
 Warren Mitchell as 'Honest' Marcel 
 Kenneth Griffith as Orator 
 Neil McCarthy as the Sergeant
 Tutte Lemkow as the Corporal
 Dirk Bogarde as Dr Simon Sparrow
 Sid James as Dance Instructor
 Michael Bentine as Psychologist 
 Graham Crowden as Naval Officer 
 Guy Standeven	as American Naval Officer 
 Andrew Sachs as US Seaman
 Rodney Bewes as Recruitment interviewee 
 Richard Vernon as Government Official 
 Wanda Ventham as Dartmouth Girl

Production
The film was based on a 1959 novel by John Winton, a pseudonym for Royal Navy Lieutenant Commander John Pratt. The book was popular and led to a number of sequels including We Saw the Sea, Down the Hatch and Never go to Sea. In early 1959 producer Daniel Angel bought the film rights as a vehicle for Kenneth More.

Angel was blacklisted by cinema chains in England for two years for selling his films to television. We Joined the Navy was his comeback film. "They held out longer than I thought they would," said Angel. "The reasons for the unbanning are unspecified. I was just made to understand that if I produced films, the exhibitors would consider showing them."

In 1961 Daniel Angel signed a deal to produce a number of movies for Associated British of which this was to be the first (West 11 was the second).

More made it after his attempts to star in a film based on the book White Rabbit fell through. He called We Joined the Navy "the funniest script I've ever read" and said "it will be the I'm Alright Jack of the navy."

Filming started in Villefrance in the south of France on 1 May 1962 then continued at Elstree Studios. Toyes said Dirk Bogarde did a cameo as a favour to More and Danny Angel. "He was wonderful," said the director. "He came down, he only had had one very short scene to do, there were lots and lots of little cameo parts. And he never put a foot wrong, never had to have another tape, just came in and
did it and had gone in about half an hour."

It was Mischa Auer's first English language film in a number of years.

Reception
The Guardian called it "a good romp".

Toye later said "the first half" of the film with "the boys being at Dartmouth and then being accepted for the navy and taking their various jobs and being, they became the three midshipmen... all that worked splendidly." However she said in the second half "it all took a funny turn and it became a bit political and by that time the mood of the film was comedy and it just, I don’t think it worked really. But it was the most fantastic cast."

Home video
A Region 2 DVD of We Joined the Navy was released by Network on 16 February 2015. The disc features a 2.35:1 anamorphic transfer.

References

External links
 
We Joined the Navy at BFI
We Joined the Navy at TCMDB

1962 films
1962 comedy films
CinemaScope films
Films shot at Associated British Studios
Films directed by Wendy Toye
Military humor in film
British comedy films
Films shot in Devon
Films set in Devon
Films set in London
Films set in Nice
Films scored by Ron Grainer
Films based on British novels
1960s English-language films
1960s British films